Mohd Ghouse is an Indian politician from Old City Hyderabad, ex corporator to All India Majlis-e-Ittehadul Muslimeen from Charminar, who served the party for more than two decades. He quit AIMIM and joined]. and again joined AIMIM

References

Telangana politicians
Politicians from Hyderabad, India
Indian National Congress politicians from Telangana
All India Majlis-e-Ittehadul Muslimeen politicians
Indian Muslims
Year of birth missing
Possibly living people